Żegocina  is a village and sołectwo in Bochnia County, Lesser Poland Voivodeship, in southern Poland. It is the seat of the gmina (administrative district) called Gmina Żegocina.

Origins
The settlement was founded by Wierzbięta in the 12th century. A church was established in 1293 by the knight Zbigniew Żegota, of the clan Topór.

References

Villages in Bochnia County